AppalCART (Appalachian Campus Area Rapid Transit) is a free public bus network located in Boone, North Carolina. It provides fare-free fixed route and paratransit service throughout Appalachian State University and Boone, as well as low-fare van service to other towns within Watauga County. In 2013, AppalCART reported a ridership of 1,712,873 passenger trips.

AppalCART is governed by an 8-member board. The current chairman of the board is Quint David. It receives its funding from a mix of federal, state, local, and Appalachian State University funds.

References

External links
Official Website
Chauffeur Service

Bus transportation in North Carolina
University and college bus systems